Mr. Davis is the eleventh studio album by American rapper Gucci Mane. It was released on October 13, 2017, by GUWOP Enterprises, RBC Records and Atlantic Records. The album is Gucci Mane's second commercial project of the year of 2017, following the Droptopwop (2017) mixtape. It features guest appearances from Nicki Minaj, Monica, Chris Brown, Migos, The Weeknd, ASAP Rocky, Big Sean, Ty Dolla Sign, Schoolboy Q, Slim Jxmmi, Young Dolph and Rico Love.

Mr. Davis was supported by three singles: "Make Love", "Tone It Down" and "I Get the Bag". The album charted at number two on the US Billboard 200, and received generally positive reviews from critics.

Background
Gucci Mane announced the album's title, track listing and cover art on August 17, 2017, along with the pre-order.

Promotion
Before the release of Droptopwop (2017), Gucci Mane released the first single to Mr. Davis, "Make Love" with Nicki Minaj, on February 23, 2017. The album's lead single, "Tone It Down" featuring Chris Brown, was released on June 20, 2017.

"I Get the Bag" featuring Migos, was released as a promotional single on August 18, 2017, along with a music video. It was then sent to urban contemporary radio on September 5, 2017, as the album's third single. On September 13, 2017, Gucci Mane released the song, "Curve" featuring The Weeknd, as the album's promotional single.

Critical reception

Mr. Davis was met with generally positive reviews. At Metacritic, which assigns a normalized rating out of 100 to reviews from professional publications, the album received an average score of 77, based on seven reviews.

Neil Z. Yeung of AllMusic gave a positive review, stating "The songs pop, the production is memorable, and the guests weave effortlessly into their respective tracks without detracting from Gucci's signature delivery". Evan Rytlewski of Pitchfork said, "Between this spring's cold, uncompromising Droptopwop and the personable crossover stab of Mr. Davis, Gucci Mane is making his most engaging music since his Trap Back/Trap God resurgence". Scott Glaysher of XXL stated, "Mr. Davis is stripped-down, honest and straight to the point". Ural Garrett of HipHopDX wrote: "The album doesn't move the needle for Guwop's creative progression forward and at times sounds as if it doesn't even aspire to. In a nutshell, Mr. Davis is simply a party celebrating Gucci's personal growth alongside his star-studded friends."

Matthew Cooper of Clash saying "There is plenty of time for Guwop to build upon the formula that already has him winning". In a mixed review, The Guardians Ben Beaumont-Thomas stated: "With little to no actual wordplay to his boasts, the materialism gets a little wearing, and he embarrasses himself with "Tone It Down", a cheap knock-off of Drake's "Portland". Nicki Minaj is the best of the A-list guests, delivering imperial subliminal disses on "Make Love"."

Commercial performance
Mr. Davis debuted at number two on the US Billboard 200 with 70,000 album-equivalent units, of which 21,000 were pure album sales. It is Gucci Mane's fourth US top 10 album and the second largest debut sales week of his career.

Track listing

Notes
  signifies an additional producer

Personnel
Credits adapted from the album's liner notes and Tidal.

Performers
 Gucci Mane – primary artist
 Migos – featured artist (track 3)
 Slim Jxmmi – featured artist track 4)
 Young Dolph – featured artist (track 4)
 The Weeknd – featured artist (track 5)
 Ty Dolla Sign – featured artist (track 6)
 Big Sean – featured artist (track 9)
 Monica – featured artist (track 10)
 Schoolboy Q – featured artist (track 11)
 Chris Brown – featured artist (track 12)
 Nicki Minaj – featured artist (track 13)
 ASAP Rocky – featured artist (track 15)
 Rico Love – featured artist (track 16)

Technical
 Colin Sing – mastering engineer (all tracks)
 Kori Anders – mixing engineer (tracks 1, 2, 5, 9, 11, 12, 14, 17)
 Eddie "eMIX" Hernàndez – recording engineer (tracks 2, 3, 5, 17)
 Jaycen Joshua – mixing engineer (tracks 12, 13)
 Chad Roper – recording engineer (tracks 10, 16)
 Marcella "Ms Lago" Araica – mixing engineer (track 10)
 Chad Jolley – additional recording engineer (tracks 10, 16)
 Dana Richard – recording engineer (track 16)
 Nathan Burgess – recording engineer (track 16)
 Niko Marzouca – mixing engineer (track 16)
 Robert Marks – mixing engineer (tracks 16)

Production
 Murda Beatz – producer (track 1)
 Cubeatz – producer (track 1)
 Zaytoven – producer (tracks 2, 17)
 Metro Boomin – producer (tracks 3, 15)
 Southside – producer (tracks 3, 11, 13, 15)
 Mike Will Made It – producer (track 4)
 Myles Harris – producer (track 4)
 Nav – producer (track 5)
 Ben Billions – producer (track 8)
 OG Parker – producer (track 6)
 TM88 – producer (tracks 6, 14)
 Key Wane – producer (track 9)
 Danja – producer (track 10), additional producer (track 16)
 Rico Love – producer (track 10)
 Cardiak – producer (track 12)
 Hitmaka – producer (track 12)
 Chris Bosh – producer (track 16)

Additional personnel
 Gucci Mane – executive producer
 Jimmy Fontaine – photography
 Virgilio Tzaj – art direction and design
 Carolyn Tracey – packaging project director
 Shun Melson – styling direction

Charts

Weekly charts

Year-end charts

Certifications

References

2017 albums
Gucci Mane albums
Atlantic Records albums
Albums produced by Cubeatz
Albums produced by Danja (record producer)
Albums produced by Detail (record producer)
Albums produced by Honorable C.N.O.T.E.
Albums produced by Key Wane
Albums produced by Metro Boomin
Albums produced by Mike Will Made It
Albums produced by Murda Beatz
Albums produced by Rico Love
Albums produced by Southside (record producer)
Albums produced by Zaytoven
Albums produced by TM88